This is a list of shopping centres in Namibia with at least two anchor tenants such as supermarkets, hypermarkets, multicinemas, and department stores.

References

Shopping centres
Namibia
Retailing in Namibia